Skjern Bank Arena is an indoor sports arena in Skjern, Denmark primarily used for handball. It is located in the local center Ringkøbing-Skjern Kulturcenter. The arena can seat 2,400 spectators and is home to Danish Handball League team Skjern Håndbold. The Skjern Bank Arena often hosts handball games for the home team Skjern Håndbold and other sports related events.

External links
 Skjern Bank Arena

Handball venues in Denmark
Indoor arenas in Denmark